Antonio Costa (1847–1915) was an Italian painter.

Biography
He was born in Florence, brother of Oreste Costa, also a painter, and like him and trained under Antonio Ciseri in the Academy of Fine Arts of Florence. His son Emanuele was a member of the impressionist Machiaioli movement of painters. Antonio Costa is also the name of an 18th-century ecclesiastical scholar born in Piacenza.

References

1847 births
1915 deaths
19th-century Italian painters
Italian male painters
20th-century Italian painters
Painters from Florence
19th-century Italian male artists
20th-century Italian male artists